The Quezon City Council is Quezon City's Sangguniang Panlungsod or legislature. It is composed of 36 councilors, with 6 councilors elected from Quezon City's six councilor districts (coextensive with the Legislative districts of Quezon City) and two councilors elected from the ranks of barangay (neighborhood) chairmen and the Sangguniang Kabataan (SK; youth councils). The presiding officer of the council is the Vice Mayor, who is elected citywide.

History
The Quezon City Council was originally formed on October 12, 1939, pursuant to the provisions of Section 11 of Commonwealth Act No. 502, otherwise known as "An Act to Create Quezon City".

In its first formation, there were only three members, all appointed by the President of the Philippines. The first three members of the council were Dr. Eusebio Aguilar (Director of Health and City Health Officer), Jose Paez (Engineering Division of the Capital City Planning Commission) and Alejandro Roces Sr. (General Manager of the People's Homesite Corporation).

Membership in the City Council increased as the city's population grew. By 1959, there were eight councilors. In 1972, the council's membership was increased to 16; four for each of the city's four districts. From 1988 to 2010, the council's composition increased to 27 as each of the four districts elected 6 councilors with an additional of two ex-officio members, plus the vice mayor, serving as the council's presiding officer.

When Republic Act No. 10170 was signed into law, creating two new legislative districts for Quezon City, 12 additional councilors were added to the council, increasing its membership to 39.

Powers, duties and functions
The Sangguniang Panlungsod, as the legislative body of the city, is mandated by the Local Government Code of 1991 (Republic Act No. 7160) to:

Enact ordinances;
Approve resolutions;
Appropriate funds for the general welfare of the city and its inhabitants; and
Ensure the proper exercise of the corporate powers of the city as provided for under Section 22 of the Local Government Code.

Furthermore, the following duties and functions are relegated to the Sangguniang Panlungsod:

Approve ordinances and pass resolutions necessary for an efficient and effective city government;
Generate and maximize the use of resources and revenues for the development plans, program objectives and priorities of the city as provided for under section 18 of the Local Government Code of 1991, with particular attention to agro-industrial development and citywide growth and progress;
Enact ordinances granting franchises and authorizing the issuance of permits or licenses, upon such conditions and for such purposes intended to promote the general welfare of the inhabitants of the city but subject to the provisions of Book II of the Local Government Code of 1991;
Regulate activities relative to the use of land, buildings, and structures within the city in order to promote the general welfare of its inhabitants;
Approve ordinances which shall ensure the efficient and effective delivery of the basic services and facilities as provided for under Section 17 of the Local Government Code; and
Exercise such other powers and perform such other duties and functions as may be prescribed by law or ordinance.

Membership
Each of Quezon City's six councilor districts elects six councilors to the council. In plurality-at-large voting, a voter may vote up to six candidates, with the candidates having the six highest number of votes being elected. In addition, the barangay chairmen and the SK chairmen throughout the city elect amongst themselves their representatives to the council. Hence, there are 38 councilors.

City council elections are synchronized with other elections in the country. Elections are held every first Monday of May every third year since 1992.

Current councils
''These are members and parties affiliated after the 2022 local election.

Former councils

Prominent members
Ponciano Bernardo - engineer, former Quezon City mayor
Herbert Bautista - actor, former Quezon City mayor
Joy Belmonte - Quezon City mayor, former vice mayor
Bernadette Herrera - House of Representatives member for Bagong Henerasyon
Aiko Melendez - actress
Franz Pumaren - basketball coach
Anjo Yllana - actor-comedian and host

References

City councils in the Philippines
Politics of Quezon City